The Veneto Classic is a one-day road cycling race held annually since 2021 in Veneto, Italy. It is on the UCI Europe Tour calendar as a 1.1 rated event.

Winners

References

External links
Official website 

UCI Europe Tour races
Cycle races in Italy
Recurring sporting events established in 2021
2021 establishments in Italy